Sudivaripalem is a Village in Inkollu Mandal in Prakasam District of Andhra Pradesh State, India.

References

Villages in Prakasam district